Paris-Presse was a French newspaper published in Paris between 1944 and 1970.

It was created by Philippe Barres (1896-1975), with Ève Curie (1904-2007), daughter of Marie Curie. They ran the newspaper until 1949.

History 

The first issue appeared on 13 November 1944. It stood in second place behind France Soir.

In 1948, it became the Paris-Presse-Intransigeant.

In 1948, Gaston Bonheur became its editor.

In 1951, suffering from competition with France Soir, it turned under the leadership of Max Corre.

In 1965, it was no longer an edition of France Soir. It saw many of its writers from (Gilbert Guilleminault L'Aurore, as Philippe Bernert, Anne Manson ...) then it was absorbed by France Soir.

Journalists
Journalists who worked for the paper included: 

Marcel Haedrich (1913-2003)

Guilleminault Gilbert (1914-1990)

Albert Ollivier (1915-1964)

Pierre Desgraupes (1918-1993)

Jean Lartéguy (1920-2011)

Maurice Bernardet (1921-2008)

Marcel Giuglaris (1922-2010)

Pierre Rey (1930-)

Bernard Michal (1932-)

Kléber Haedens (1954-)

Gérard de Villiers (1929-2013)

Jean Vermorel (1935-)

References 

1944 establishments in France
Defunct newspapers published in France
Newspapers published in Paris
Publications established in 1944
Daily newspapers published in France